Stanhopea ecornuta is a species of orchid endemic to Central America (Belize, Costa Rica, El Salvador, Guatemala, Honduras, Nicaragua and Panama).

References

External links 

ecornuta
Orchids of Central America
Orchids of Belize
Orchids of Costa Rica
Orchids of El Salvador
Orchids of Guatemala
Orchids of Honduras
Orchids of Nicaragua
Orchids of Panama